William Henry "D.J." Dozier, Jr. (born September 21, 1965) is an American former National Football League running back and Major League Baseball outfielder. He played five seasons with the NFL's Minnesota Vikings and Detroit Lions from 1987 to 1991, and played one season with the MLB's New York Mets in 1992. He currently resides in Virginia Beach, Virginia.

Early years
Dozier was born in Norfolk, Virginia.  He attended Kempsville High School in Virginia Beach, Virginia, and later attended Penn State University. When D.J. was 12 years old, he played on a youth basketball team for Kempsville and made it to the Virginia Beach city championship game. His team played against the Green Run Suns, who had future NBA Hall of Fame player David Robinson on the team. Kempsville won the game, mainly in part to David Robinson (who was a small forward and not the tallest player on the team nor highest scorer) missing the game due to having come down with the mumps. Dozier, who would eventually grow to 6 feet tall, was already 5'9" or 5'10" by 12 years old. With his athleticism, skill and size, he dominated the undefeated Suns and won the city championship.

Football career
Dozier scored the winning touchdown of Penn State's 1987 National Championship Fiesta Bowl victory over Miami.
Dozier was drafted out of Penn State in the first round (#14 overall) of the 1987 NFL Draft.
He shared the November 11, 1985 cover of Sports Illustrated with Florida's Ray McDonald.
He had a career average of 4.0 yards per carry. In 1991—his final season—he averaged 5.3 yards per rush.
He fumbled the ball only 4 times during his 5-year professional career.
Dozier had a perfect 158.3 passer rating as a pro. (He was 1-for-1 for 19 yards and a touchdown)
Dozier caught 33 career passes, averaging 9.1 yards per catch.
As a kick returner, he averaged 19.4 yards per return.

Baseball career
Dozier, who was 6'0", 202 pounds and who threw and batted right-handed was originally drafted by the Detroit Tigers in the 18th round in 1983 (459th overall). He opted not to sign and decided to go to college, where he would pursue his football career.

In 1990, the New York Mets signed him as an amateur free agent. He spent 1990 and 1991 in the minor leagues, where he showed good speed (he stole 33 bases with St. Lucie in 1990) and also some power (in 1990, he hit 13 home runs with St. Lucie).  He played for the Williamsport Bills in 1991.

After spending some time in the minors in 1992, he was called up to the Major Leagues and made his debut on May 6, 1992 at the age of 26. In 25 games, he hit .191 with 4 stolen bases and 19 strikeouts in 47 at-bats. Defensively, he committed 1 error for a fielding percentage of .971.

On October 26, 1992, Dozier was traded with catcher Raul Casanova and pitcher Wally Whitehurst for shortstop/third baseman Tony Fernández.

References

External links

D.J. Dozier's Penn State Nittany Lions 1986 National Championship Football Pennant

1965 births
Living people
African-American baseball players
All-American college football players
American football running backs
Baseball players from Norfolk, Virginia
Detroit Lions players
Major League Baseball left fielders
Minnesota Vikings players
Penn State Nittany Lions baseball players
Penn State Nittany Lions football players
New York Mets players
Sportspeople from Virginia Beach, Virginia
Players of American football from Norfolk, Virginia
Jackson Mets players
Las Vegas Stars (baseball) players
Louisville Redbirds players
St. Lucie Mets players
Tidewater Tides players
Williamsport Bills players
21st-century African-American people
20th-century African-American sportspeople